Mount Stenhouse or Shan Tei Tong is the highest peak on Lamma Island in Hong Kong, with a height of  above sea level.

It is probably named after Humphrey Fleming Senhouse, but acquired a misspelling over time.

Access 
The paths leading up to the summit are rocky and not maintained by the government. Only experienced hikers should summit this peak.

References

See also 
 List of mountains, peaks and hills in Hong Kong
 Ling Kok Shan
Sok Kwu Wan

Lamma Island